The Deepbodied Queenfish, Scomberoides pelagicus, is a species of ray-finned fish in the family Carangidae, 
the jacks and related fishes.  The fish's distribution range consists of the peninsular region of the Indian coast, 
the Malaysian region of the South China Sea, and Manila Bay, Philippines.

References

Fish described in 2022
pelagicus